Ratha (Proto-Indo-Iranian: *Hrátʰas, Sanskrit: रथ, ; Avestan: raθa) is also known as the Indo-Iranian term for a spoked-wheel chariot or a cart of antiquity.

Harappan Civilisation

The Indus Valley Civilization sites of Daimabad and Harappa in the Indian subcontinent, there is evidence for the use of terracotta model carts as early as 3500 BC during the Ravi Phase. There is evidence of wheeled vehicles (especially miniature models) in the Indus Valley Civilization, but not of chariots. According to Kenoyer,

Indo-Aryan Indigenists have argued for the presence of chariots before its introduction by the Indo-Aryans in the early 2nd millennium BCE. Archaeologist B. B. Lal argues that finds of terracotta wheels painted lines (or low relief lines) and similar seals indicate the existence and use of spoked wheel chariots in Harappan Civilization, as showed in the Bhirrana excavations in 2005–06. Bhagwan Singh has made a similar assertion and S.R. Rao has presented evidence of chariots in bronze models from Daimabad (Late Harappan).

The earliest Copper-Bronze Age carts remains that have been found in India (at Sinauli) have been dated to 1900BCE which were interpreted by some as horse-pulled "chariots", predating the arrival of the horse-centered Indo-Aryans.
Others object, noting that solid wheels belong to carts, not chariots.

Indo-Aryans

Proto-Indo-Iranians

Horse-drawn chariots, as well as its cult and associated rituals, were spread by the Indo-Iranians, and horses and horse-drawn chariots were introduced in India by the Indo-Aryans.

The earliest evidence for chariots in southern Central Asia (on the Oxus) dates to the Achaemenid period (apart from chariots harnessed by oxen, as seen on petroglyphs). No Andronovian chariot burial has been found south of the Oxus.

Textual evidence

Chariots figure prominently in the Rigveda, evidencing their presence in India in the 2nd millennium BCE. Notably, the Rigveda differentiates between the Ratha (chariot) and the Anas (often translated as "cart"). Rigvedic chariots are described as made of the wood of Salmali (RV 10.85.20), Khadira and Simsapa (RV 3.53.19) trees. While the number of wheels varies, chariot measurements for each configuration are found in the Shulba Sutras.

Chariots also feature prominently in later texts, including the other Vedas, the Puranas and the great Hindu epics (Ramayana and Mahabharata). Indeed, most of the deities in the Hindu pantheon are portrayed as riding them. Among Rigvedic deities, notably Ushas (the dawn) rides in a chariot, as well as Agni in his function as a messenger between gods and men. In RV 6.61.13, the Sarasvati river is described as being wide and speedy, like a (Rigvedic) chariot.

Remains

There are a few depictions of chariots among the petroglyphs in the sandstone of the Vindhya range. Two depictions of chariots are found in Morhana Pahar, Mirzapur district. One shows a team of two horses, with the head of a single driver visible. The other one is drawn by four horses, has six-spoked wheels, and shows a driver standing up in a large chariot-box. This chariot is being attacked, with a figure wielding a shield and a mace standing at its path, and another figure armed with bow and arrow threatening its right flank. It has been suggested (Sparreboom 1985:87) that the drawings record a story, most probably dating to the early centuries BC, from some center in the area of the Ganges–Yamuna plain into the territory of still neolithic hunting tribes. The drawings would then be a representation of foreign technology, comparable to the Arnhem Land Aboriginal rock paintings depicting Westerners. The very realistic chariots carved into the Sanchi stupas are dated to roughly the 1st century BCE.

In Hindu temple festivals 

Ratha or Rath means a chariot or car made from wood with wheels. The Ratha may be driven manually by rope, pulled by horses or elephants. Rathas are used mostly by the Hindu temples of South India for Rathoutsava (Car festival). During the festival, the temple deities are driven through the streets, accompanied by the chanting of mantra, hymns, shloka or bhajan.

Ratha Yatra is a huge Hindu festival associated with Lord Jagannath held at Puri in the state of Orissa, India during the months of June or July.

Rathas buildings
In some Hindu temples, there are shrines or buildings named rathas because they have the shape of a huge chariot or because they contain a divinity as does a temple chariot.

The most known are the Pancha Rathas (=5 rathas) in Mahabalipuram, although not with the shape of a chariot.

Another example is the Jaga mohan of the Konark Sun Temple in Konarâk, built on a platform with twelve sculptures of wheels, as a symbol of the chariot of the Sun.

Rathas in architecture

In Hindu temple architecture, a ratha is a facet or vertical offset projections on the tower (generally a Shikhara).

See also
Ashva
History of the horse in the Indian subcontinent
Temple car
 Types of carriages

Notes

References

Sources

 Edwin Bryant (2001). The Quest for the Origins of Vedic Culture. Oxford University Press. 
 Shoaib Daniyal (2018), Putting the horse before the cart: What the discovery of 4,000-year-old ‘chariot’ in UP signifies, Scroll.in
 
 Fussman, G.; Kellens, J.; Francfort, H.-P.; Tremblay, X. (2005). Aryas, Aryens et Iraniens en Asie Centrale. Institut Civilisation Indienne 
 
 
 
Peter Raulwing (2000). Horses, Chariots and Indo-Europeans, Foundations and Methods of Chariotry Research from the Viewpoint of Comparative Indo-European Linguistics. Archaeolingua, Series Minor 13, Budapest.
 Vasudha Venugopal ET bureau, https://economictimes.indiatimes.com/news/politics-and-nation/mahabharata-much-older-say-asi-archaeologists/articleshow/71658119.cms Mahabharata much older, say ASI Archaeologists , The Economic Times
 

Chariots